Valarie Jenkins is a professional disc golfer currently living in Bend, Oregon. As of the end of 2016, she is the third ranked female disc golfer in the world. She was around the sport from an early age and grew up in a disc golf family. Her mother, Sharon is a three-time Women’s Masters World Champion and her brother, Avery Jenkins is a former Men's World Champion. She began her professional career in 2003 after placing second in the PDGA Amateur World Championship. She is currently sponsored by Discraft.

Jenkins has won 16 majors during the course of her career, including four World Championships, fourth most all time (Elaine King, Juliana Korver and Paige Pierce each have won 5).

World championship era (2007–2009)
During the three years that Jenkins was the world champion, she completely dominated her sport. Over the course of these three years, she won 22 tournaments that were National Tour events or Majors. Out of the 93 events she played, she won 46. Jenkins remains one of only four women in the history of Disc Golf to have won at least 4 PDGA Professional World Championships.

2012 season
Jenkins started the 2012 season very well. She started the year by winning the A-Tier Gentlemen's Club Challenge by 7 strokes, followed by her first National Tour win of the year at the Memorial Championship.

Notable wins

Major Championships (16)

National Tour (29)

Summary

Annual statistics

The above information was gathered from Jenkins's PDGA player page.
†At Year End

Sponsorship and equipment

Jenkins is currently sponsored by Discraft.

References

External links
Valarie Jenkins Website

American disc golfers
Living people
1986 births
People from Hinckley, Ohio
People from Bend, Oregon
Sportspeople from Ohio